Kaevon Merriweather (born December 20, 1999) is an American football safety for the Iowa Hawkeyes.

Early life and high school career
Merriweather attended Romulus Senior High School in Romulus, Michigan before transferring to Belleville High School in Belleville, Michigan for his senior year. He starred in basketball in high school, receiving several offers to play basketball before committing to playing football in high school. He committed to the University of Iowa to play college football after being recruited by Iowa defensive coordinator and longtime defensive backs coach Phil Parker.

College career
Merriweather played in nine games as a true freshman at Iowa in 2018, and took a redshirt in 2019 after playing in two games in 2019. In 2020, he started five of nine games, recording 23 tackles. In 2021, he started seven of 14 games and had 42 tackles and an interception as part of a nationally elite defense. Merriweather returned to Iowa as a starter in 2022. He was named a first-team All-American by CBS Sports.

References

External links
Iowa Hawkeyes bio

1999 births
Living people
Players of American football from Michigan
American football safeties
Iowa Hawkeyes football players